Waterbeds in Trinidad! is the seventh studio album (and ninth album overall by including a greatest hits and a live album) by The Association. This album was the group's only release for Columbia Records as well as their last recorded project of the 1970s. Released in 1972, it was the last album to feature original bassist Brian Cole, who died in August that year. One last recording with Cole, the non-album track "Names, Tags, Number, & Labels", was released as a single on the Mums label the following year.

Waterbeds in Trinidad! was their lowest charted album, climbing to only #194 on Billboard. Of the two singles released in conjunction with the album, their rendition of The Lovin' Spoonful's "Darling Be Home Soon" bubbled under the Billboard charts at number 104.

Track listing

Personnel
Jules Alexander - lead guitar, vocals
Larry Ramos - lead guitar, vocals
Terry Kirkman - keyboards, vocals, harmonica, saxophone
Richard Thompson - keyboards, vocals
Jim Yester - rhythm guitar, vocals
Brian Cole - bass, vocals
Ted Bluechel - drums, percussion, vocals

References

1972 albums
Columbia Records albums
The Association albums
Albums produced by Lewis Merenstein